William Brian Hooker (November 2, 1880 – December 28, 1946) was an American poet, educator, lyricist, and librettist. He was born in New York City, the son of Elizabeth Work and William Augustus Hooker, who was a mining engineer for the New York firm of Hooker and Lawrence. His family was well known in Hartford, Connecticut having descended from Thomas Hooker, a prominent Puritan religious and colonial leader who founded the Colony of Connecticut.

Hooker attended Yale College in the class of 1902, where he was a writer, editor and business manager for campus humor magazine The Yale Record.  He was an editor of the Yale Record collection Yale Fun (1901).  He died in New London, Connecticut, aged 66.

Works

Hooker's poetry was published in The Century Magazine, The Forum, Hampton's Magazine, Harper's Magazine, McClure's Magazine, Scribner's Magazine, Smart Set, and the Yale Review.

Hooker wrote the librettos for two operas by Horatio Parker, Mona (opera) and Fairyland. He co-wrote the libretto and lyrics for Rudolf Friml's 1925 operetta The Vagabond King, and is noted for his 1923 English translation of Edmond Rostand's Cyrano de Bergerac.

José Ferrer played Cyrano in a highly acclaimed 1946 Broadway version of the play which used this translation, winning a Tony Award for his performance. At the same time, Ralph Richardson was also appearing as Cyrano in a London production of the play, again using this translation. Ferrer then won an Oscar as Best Actor for the 1950 film adaptation, which used the same translation.

References
Notes

Bibliography
 Green, Stanley (1976), Encyclopaedia of the Musical Theatre, Dodd, Mead, p. 195. 
 Yardley, Jonathan (2005) 'Cyrano,' Gaining in the Translation, The Washington Post, February 2, 2005, p. C01. Accessed July 10, 2011.

External links
 
 Selected poetry, fiction and essays by Brian Hooker, from the archives of Harper's Magazine.
 Books by Brian Hooker at Google Books.

American opera librettists
American male poets
1880 births
1946 deaths
Yale College alumni
Writers from New York City
20th-century American poets
20th-century American dramatists and playwrights
20th-century American translators
20th-century American male writers
Poets from New York (state)